Sławoj Leszek Głódź (born 13 August 1945) is a Polish prelate of the Catholic Church who served as Archbishop of Gdańsk from 2008 to 2020. He has been a bishop since 1991 and before that spent a decade working in the Roman Curia.

Early life and Priesthood
He was born in Bobrówka on 13 August 1945. He entered  the major seminary of Białystok in 1964, however due to the communist regime in Poland he had to interrupt his studies between 1966-1968, as the mandatory military service in clerical companies. During his service he obtained the specialization of a sapper of Pontoons. He completed his priestly formation and was ordained a priest on 14 June 1970. Between He continued his studies on canon law at the Catholic University of Lublin and the Pontifical Oriental Institute, where he earned a doctorate in eastern canon law in 1980.

From 1981 to 1991 he worked in Rome in the offices of the Congregation for the Oriental Churches, where he received the dignity of a prelate in 1984.

Bishop 
Pope John Paul II appointed him titular bishop of Bettonium and the Bishop of the newly re-created Military Ordinary of Poland on 21 January 1991. He received his episcopal consecration from Cardinal Józef Glemp on 23 February 1991 in the Jasna Góra Basilica in Częstochowa. On 18 April 1991 he was appointed to the rank of General of the Brigade, and on 11 November 1993 to the rank of Divisional general. During the office of the bishop, he reconstructed the diocesan structures of the Ordinariate, establishing a network of military parishes across Poland. He also established two new distinctions of the Ordinariate: in 1995 the diploma "Benemerenti" and in 2001 the medal "Milito pro Christo".

On 17 July 2004, John Paul raised him to the personal rank of archbishop (ad personam)  and on 26 August appointed him Bishop of the Roman Catholic Diocese of Warszawa-Praga.

On 17 April 2008, Pope Benedict XVI named him Archbishop  of Gdańsk.  His ingress to the Archcathedral of the Holy Trinity in Gdańsk-Oliwa, during which he canonically took office, took place on 26 April 2008. On 29 June 2008 he received the metropolitan pallium from the Pope in Rome. Lech Wałęsa and others protested his appointment calling it a "punishment" for the city in light of his defense of an anti-Semitic radio station and his opposition to the European Union.

In 2013, the Polish weekly magazine Wprost published an article in which the accounts of anonymous people from the surroundings of the Archbishop were presented, accusing him of humiliation and intimidation of subordinates, mobbing and the organization of alcoholic libations.

Controversy 
In May 2019, a documentary film called Tell No One about sexual abuse of minors committed by Polish priests became available on the internet and depicted Głódź as both indifferent to victims and praising a prominent priest accused as a sexual predator. Asked to comment on the film, he said: "I don't watch any old thing." He then issued a statement that said: "I did not intend to offend victims of sexual abuse with my words, and I am sorry." Some local clergy called for him to resign. In 2019, three protestors toppled a statue of Henryk Jankowski following revelations that he sexually abused Barbara Borowiecka when she was a girl. Jankowski, who in 2004 had been the subject of an inconclusive criminal investigation involving the sexual abuse of a boy, had been defrocked in 2005. He died in 2010 without ever being convicted of sex abuse. Personal chaplain to Lech Wałęsa, Rev. Franciszek Cybula, had been accused of committing acts of sex abuse as well.

Resignation 
Pope Francis accepted Glodz's resignation as Archbishop of Gdańsk on his 75th birthday, 13 August 2020, after reports that he had covered up abuse committed by Jankowski and Cybula. Because of the timing, the move was described as "cleaning house". Glodz had also presided at Cybula's funeral. 

On 2 June 2020, the Congregation for Bishops ordered Kazimierz Nycz, Archbishop of Warsaw, to conduct an investigation; it was concluded by 5 November 2020. In March 2021, Glodz was sanctioned by the Vatican and ordered to live outside his former diocese, and told he could not participate in public liturgies or non-religious gatherings within the territory of the diocese.

References

External links
 Catholic Hierarchy: Archbishop Sławoj Leszek Głódź 

1945 births
Living people
People from Mońki County
21st-century Roman Catholic archbishops in Poland
Bishops of Gdańsk
John Paul II Catholic University of Lublin alumni
Pontifical Oriental Institute alumni
Ecclesiastical passivity to Catholic sexual abuse cases